Umar Hassan or Omar Hassan is current Commander of Operation Zone 3 for the African nation Eritrea. The country has five operation zones, each headed by a high-ranking military official. These zones overlap the six administrative regions. The power of the Operation Zone commanders supersedes that of the administrators who head the six regions.

References 

Year of birth missing (living people)
Living people
Eritrean soldiers